Amer Osmanagić (born 7 March 1989) is a Bosnian professional footballer who plays as a midfielder for Greek Football League club PO Triglia.

Club career
Born in Janja, SR Bosnia and Herzegovina, then still part of SFR Yugoslavia, he started playing in the youth teams of FK Sloboda Tuzla, later moving to Belgrade's FK Partizan. In the season 2007-08 he played his first senior season for Partizan's satellite club FK Teleoptik. In January 2009, he signed his first professional senior contract with Serbian SuperLiga club OFK Belgrade. In the summer of 2009, he was loaned to FK Velež Mostar. In 2009, he was voted the best player in the Bosnian Premier League by journalists.

On 18 June 2010, he was loaned to Zagłębie Lubin on a one-year deal. and after one season in the Polish Ekstraklasa, he returned to OFK Beograd where he would play for the 2011–12 Serbian SuperLiga season.

In summer 2012 Osmanagić moved to Norway and signed a three-year contract with FK Haugesund. He made his debut in Tippeligaen and scored his first goal in the match against Vålerenga on 3 August 2012. Osmanagić played in the league-match against Brann and the cup-match Hødd, but did not play again for Haugesund and on 24 October 2012 the club terminated his contract. On 26 July 2014 Osmanagić signed for Čelik Zenica to then move to Olimpic Sarajevo on 1 January 2015, where he played until the end of the season.

International career
Since 2008 he has been member of the Bosnia and Herzegovina national under-21 football team.  Earlier, he had represented Bosnia at U-17 and U-19 level.

Honours
Sarajevo
Bosnian Cup: 2013–14

Olimpik
Bosnian Cup: 2014–15

Individual
Awards
Bosnian Premier League Player of the Year: 2009

References

External links

Amer Osmanagić at Utakmica.rs

1989 births
Living people
People from Janja
Bosniaks of Bosnia and Herzegovina
Association football midfielders
Bosnia and Herzegovina footballers
Bosnia and Herzegovina youth international footballers
Bosnia and Herzegovina under-21 international footballers
FK Teleoptik players
OFK Beograd players
FK Velež Mostar players
Zagłębie Lubin players
FK Haugesund players
FK Sarajevo players
NK Čelik Zenica players
FK Olimpik players
FK Novi Pazar players
FK Zemun players
FK Sloboda Tuzla players
FK Zvijezda 09 players
Kalamata F.C. players
Serbian First League players
Serbian SuperLiga players
Premier League of Bosnia and Herzegovina players
Ekstraklasa players
Eliteserien players
Football League (Greece) players
Bosnia and Herzegovina expatriate footballers
Expatriate footballers in Serbia and Montenegro
Bosnia and Herzegovina expatriate sportspeople in Serbia and Montenegro
Expatriate footballers in Serbia
Expatriate footballers in Poland
Bosnia and Herzegovina expatriate sportspeople in Poland
Expatriate footballers in Norway
Bosnia and Herzegovina expatriate sportspeople in Norway
Expatriate footballers in Greece
Bosnia and Herzegovina expatriate sportspeople in Greece